Grigor'yevka is a village in the Issyk-Kul Region of Kyrgyzstan. It is part of the Issyk-Kul District. Its population was 5,891 in 2021. Described as a 'pretty village', it is the start to treks up the 32km Chon Ak-Suu canyon. To the west on highway A363 is Bosteri, and to the east, Semyonovka.

Population

References
 

Populated places in Issyk-Kul Region